Harold Reina (born July 18, 1990) is a Colombian football forward.

Titles

References

1990 births
Living people
Colombian footballers
Association football forwards
Deportivo Cali footballers
Atlético La Sabana footballers
Pacífico F.C. players
Cúcuta Deportivo footballers
The Strongest players
Cortuluá footballers
AEK Larnaca FC players
Apollon Limassol FC players
Deportivo Pasto footballers
Deportivo Pereira footballers
Nacional Potosí players
Cypriot First Division players
Bolivian Primera División players
Categoría Primera A players
Categoría Primera B players
Colombian expatriate footballers
Colombian expatriate sportspeople in Bolivia
Expatriate footballers in Bolivia
Colombian expatriate sportspeople in Cyprus
Expatriate footballers in Cyprus
Sportspeople from Valle del Cauca Department